Feist is a Canadian singer-songwriter from Amherst, Nova Scotia. She has released four studio albums as a member of the indie rock supergroup Broken Social Scene: Feel Good Lost (2001), You Forgot It in People (2002), Bee Hives (2004), and Broken Social Scene (2005). All four albums were released with the Arts & Crafts record label. She has also released four studio albums as a solo artist: Monarch (Lay Your Jewelled Head Down) (1999), Let It Die (2004), Open Season (2006), and The Reminder (2007). These four albums were also released with the Arts & Crafts record label, with the exception of her first album, which was released by the Bobby Dazzler record label.

Feist has found success at awards shows in Canada, receiving eleven awards from sixteen nominations at the Juno Awards. She received five awards from five nominations in 2008 from the Juno Awards, including Single of the Year for "1234", Album of the Year for The Reminder, and Artist of the Year. She has also received four Grammy Award nominations, including Best Pop Vocal Album for The Reminder and Best New Artist in 2008, but has yet to win an award.

APRA Awards

The APRA Awards are presented annually by the Australasian Performing Right Association (APRA). Feist has received one nomination.

|-
| 2008 || "1234" || Song of the Year ||

Antville Music Video Awards

The Antville Music Video Awards are online awards for the best music video and music video directors of the year. They were first awarded in 2005. Feist has one award.

|-
| 2007
| "1234"
| Best Choreography 
|

BRIT Awards
The BRIT Awards are the British Phonographic Industry's annual pop music awards. Feist has received two nominations.

|-
|  || Feist || Best International Female Artist || 
|-
|  || Feist || Best International Female Artist ||

Grammy Awards
The Grammy Awards are awarded annually by the National Academy of Recording Arts and Sciences of the United States. Feist has received four nominations.

|-
|rowspan="4"|  || Feist || Best New Artist || 
|-
| rowspan="2"| "1234" || Best Female Pop Vocal Performance || 
|-
| Best Short Form Music Video || 
|-
| The Reminder || Best Pop Vocal Album ||

Juno Awards
The Juno Awards is a Canadian awards ceremony presented annually by the Canadian Academy of Recording Arts and Sciences. Feist has received 11 awards from 16 nominations.

|-
|rowspan="4"|  || Let It Die || Alternative Album of the Year || 
|-
| Feist || New Artist of the Year || 
|-
| "One Evening" || Video of the Year || 
|-
| "Inside and Out" || Single of the Year || 
|-
|rowspan="5"|  ||rowspan="2"| Feist || Artist of the Year || 
|-
| Songwriter of the Year || 
|-
| "1234" || Single of the Year || 
|-
| rowspan=2|The Reminder || Album of the Year || 
|-
| Pop Album of the Year || 
|-
| rowspan=2 |  || Feist || Juno Fan Choice Award || 
|-
| "Honey Honey" || Video of the Year || 
|-
| rowspan=5 |  || rowspan=2|Feist || Artist of the Year || 
|-
| Songwriter of the Year || 
|-
| rowspan=2|Metals || Adult Alternative Album of the Year || 
|-
| Recording Package of the Year || 
|-
| Look at What the Light Did Now || Music DVD of the Year ||

MuchMusic Video Awards
The MuchMusic Video Awards is an annual awards ceremony presented by the Canadian music video channel MuchMusic. Feist has received two nominations.

|-
| 2006 || "Mushaboom" || MuchMoreMusic Award || 
|-
| 2007 || "My Moon My Man" || MuchMoreMusic Award ||

Polaris Music Prizes

The Polaris Music Prize is awarded annually to one Canadian album. Feist has received three nominations and won the award once.

|-
| 2007 || The Reminder || Polaris Music Prize || 
|-
|2012 || Metals ||Polaris Music Prize || 
|-
| 2017 || Pleasure || Polaris Music Prize ||

Shortlist Music Prize
The Shortlist Music Prize is a music award given annually to an album released in the United States within the last year. Feist has received one award.

|-
| 2007 || The Reminder || Shortlist Music Prize ||

UK Music Video Awards

|-
| rowspan=2|2012 || rowspan=2|"The Bad in Each Other" || Best Cinematography in a Video in Association with Panalux || 
|-
| Best Alternative Video – International ||

References

External links
 Feist's official website

Feist